Dvorany nad Nitrou is a municipality in the Topoľčany District of the Nitra Region, Slovakia. In 2011 had a population of 754 inhabitants.

See also
 List of municipalities and towns in Slovakia

References

Genealogical resources

The records for genealogical research are available at the state archive "Statny Archiv in Nitra, Slovakia"

 Roman Catholic church records (births/marriages/deaths): 1758-1895 (parish B)

External links
Dvorany Nad Nitrou
Official homepage 
Surnames of living people in Dvorany nad Nitrou

Villages and municipalities in Topoľčany District